The following is an annotated list of swimming pools in the Philippines that conform to the Olympic standard. Additionally, it lists other long-course facilities that do not quite come up to the full standard of 50 × 25 metres, 10 (middle 8 used) lanes.

Olympic size pools

Planned or under construction

Other 50 metre pools

Planned or under construction/refurbishment

See also
List of football stadiums in the Philippines
List of indoor arenas in the Philippines
List of baseball stadiums in the Philippines
Philippine Swimming

References

Long course swimming pools
Swimming in the Philippines
Philippines